Joshua Paul Dallas (born December 18, 1978) is an American actor. He is best known for his roles as Prince Charming/David Nolan in the ABC television series Once Upon a Time and as Ben Stone in the NBC/Netflix sci-fi drama series Manifest.

Career
After graduation at Mountview Academy of Theatre Arts in England, Dallas joined the Royal Shakespeare Company, and then took part with the Royal National Theatre, English National Opera, the New Shakespeare Company, and the Young Vic.

Returning to the United States, he was cast as Fandral in Thor after Irish actor Stuart Townsend withdrew from the role days before filming was to begin. As he was a virtually unknown actor when cast, there was some speculation that Dallas was selected because there simply was not enough time to find a bigger-name replacement. To prepare for the role, Dallas viewed Errol Flynn as an inspiration (Stan Lee, in 1965, created the character based on Flynn), and watched many of his films. He commented, "I tried to bring out that little bit of Flynn-ness in it. Flynn had a lot of that boyish charm and Fandral's got all that in him." Dallas did not reprise his role in the sequel to Thor. Zachary Levi replaced him in the subsequent two films.

In 2011, he began starring in the ABC series Once Upon a Time as Prince Charming. After six seasons, Dallas did not appear in season 7 in 2017. He returned for its series finale the following year. From 2018 to 2023, he was cast as Ben Stone, in the NBC mystery/drama series Manifest, which premiered on September 24, 2018.

Personal life

Dallas was born in Louisville, Kentucky.He met British actress Lara Pulver in 2003 while working at the Johanna, Windsor. They married in 2007, and were divorced in 2011.

After separating from Pulver, Dallas started dating his Once Upon a Time co-star Ginnifer Goodwin. Dallas and Goodwin became engaged in October 2013, and married on April 12, 2014 in California. Together, they have two children.

Filmography

Film

Television

References

External links

 

1978 births
21st-century American male actors
Alumni of the Mountview Academy of Theatre Arts
American expatriate male actors in the United Kingdom
American male film actors
American male television actors
Living people
Male actors from Louisville, Kentucky
Royal Shakespeare Company members